You & I, stylized You&I, is the fourth full-length album by The Pierces. The album was released on 30 May 2011 in the United Kingdom. The album was produced by the production duo The Darktones, consisting of Coldplay bassist Guy Berryman and Rik Simpson. On 5 June 2011, the album entered the UK Albums Chart at number four.

Singles
"You'll Be Mine" was the first single released from the album, it was released on 6 March 2011 and peaked at number 46 on the UK Singles Chart. It was written by Catherine Pierce.
"Glorious" was the second single released from the album, it was released on 10 April 2011 and peaked at number 102 on the UK Singles Chart. It was originally written, recorded, and released by NY musician James Levy.
"It Will Not Be Forgotten" was the third single released from the album, It was released on 8 August 2011. It was written by Allison Pierce.
"Kissing You Goodbye" was the fourth single released from the album, it was released on 23 October 2011 and the music video on 28 November 2011. It was written by Allison and Catherine Pierce.
A video for the last track on the record called "I Put Your Records On" (Written by Allison Pierce) was released on the 5th March 2012. It shows the group traipsing through a graveyard.

Reception

You & I has garnered generally positive reviews from music critics. The Guardian gave the album a favorable review, citing it as the "straight(est)" piece by the band, a calculated move, compared to their previous albums, which they praised for their "mischief". BBC continued with praise, harking, "Kissing You Goodbye, which is so Bangles-cover-California-Dreamin’ it’s potentially litigious, there is a Susanna Hoffs-ian tremulousness to their voices. Space & Time is the husky, dusky, David Lynch-dark one. Drag You Down is the sultry one that proves these aren’t pop puppets, they’re girls with attitude. And I Put Your Records On is the one designed to up their cred with the alt-country brigade. Throughout, there are unexpected melodic twists and turns, and the whole thing feels like a bid for commercial acceptance, if indeed the market for this classy music even exists anymore." The Observer was slightly more critical, mentioning that "Their tunes may now be doe-eyed and glossy, but they are still captivating. "It Will Not Be Forgotten" examines a lost love with a faraway look in its eyes, while "Love You More" is a goth-folk sweep that features Catherine's ex, Albert Hammond Jr, on the low-slung guitar hook. Both will sound especially good in a convertible speeding down a sun-baked highway, and deserve to ring in the ears of playlisters at Radio 2. Pristine and bittersweet, "I Put Your Records On" recalls Rumer." Slant Magazine states that, although the conventional air is a little off-putting at first, "the duo pulls off "conventional" just as well as they do twisted."

Track listing

Personnel
Allison Pierce – lead & backing vocal; acoustic guitar (2,4,9-11); songwriting
Catherine Pierce – lead & backing vocal; songwriting
Rik Simpson – drum programming (1-10), keyboards (7), percussion (1,3,4); acoustic guitar & bv (3); electric guitar & bv (5); dulcimer, piano & pump organ (7); mix (5,8.10)
 Guy Berryman – keyboards (1-3,9,11); percussion (1-5,7-10); bass guitar (1-5,7-10); electric guitar (1-4,7,8); glockenspiel (1,2,4,7); omnichord (4)
Matt McGinn – electric guitar (2,9,10); acoustic guitar (7)
James Levy – acoustic guitar (1,5); electric guitar (5)
Alex Levy – electric guitar (6,8); slide guitar (8)
BJ Cole – slide guitar (3,4,9)
Tom Marsh – drums (1,3,4,5,7,9,10)
Matt Romano – drums (1,2,8)
Russell Simins – drums (5,10)
Glenn Moule – drums (7)
Jon Hopkins – pump organ & keyboards (3); organ (4)
Davide Rossi – strings (5,8,10)
 The Darktones (Rik Simpson & Guy Berryman) – production, recording

Charts and certifications

Charts

Certifications

Release history

References

2011 albums
The Pierces albums
Polydor Records albums
Albums produced by Rik Simpson